The Skywalk Hype is a German single-place paraglider that was designed and produced by Skywalk GmbH & Co. KG of Grassau, Bavaria and introduced in the mid-2000s. It is now out of production.

Design and development
The Hype was designed as an beginner to intermediate glider. The models are each named for their relative size.

Variants
Hype S
Small-sized model for lighter pilots. The glider model is DHV 1-2 certified.
Hype M
Mid-sized model for medium-weight pilots. The glider model is DHV 1-2 certified.
Hype L
Large-sized model for heavier pilots. The glider model is DHV 1-2 certified.

Specifications (Hype M)

See also
Skywalk Cayenne

References

Hype
Paragliders